Samuel Butman (April 30, 1788 – October 9, 1864) was an American politician from the U.S. state of Maine. A farmer and War of 1812 veteran, Butman served in the Maine State House before entering the U.S. House of Representatives, where he represented Maine's seventh congressional district. Late in life he entered the Maine State Senate, where he served as the chamber's president.

Butman was born in Worcester, Massachusetts, on April 30, 1788. His family moved to Dixmont in present-day Maine (then a region of Massachusetts) in 1805. There his father, an American Revolutionary War veteran, worked as a farmer.

During the War of 1812, Butman served as captain of a militia company that participated in the ill-fated Battle of Hampden. In 1820, he attended the state constitutional convention. Two years later, in 1822, he was elected to the Maine State House, and served that year and from 1826 to 1827. Butman left the state legislature to serve in the 20th and 21st Congresses (March 4, 1827 – March 3, 1831) in the U.S. House of Representatives as a representative of Maine's seventh district.

In 1846, Butman was county commissioner of Penobscot County. He served in the State Senate and was its president in 1853. He died in Plymouth, Maine, on October 9, 1864.

References

"Butman, Samuel, 1788-1864." Biographical Directory of the United States Congress. 

1788 births
1864 deaths
Members of the Maine House of Representatives
Presidents of the Maine Senate
People from Dixmont, Maine
Politicians from Worcester, Massachusetts
County commissioners in Maine
Farmers from Maine
National Republican Party members of the United States House of Representatives from Maine
19th-century American politicians